Nacharovo (Najar) is a rural locality (a village) in Nizhnekaryshevsky Selsoviet, Baltachevsky District, Bashkortostan, Russia. The population was 268 as of 2010. There are 7 streets.

Geography 
Nacharovo is located 30 km south of Starobaltachevo (the district's administrative centre) by road. Zilyazekulevo is the nearest rural locality.

References 

Rural localities in Baltachevsky District